Tripartite motif-containing protein 55 is a protein that in humans is encoded by the TRIM55 gene.

The protein encoded by this gene contains a RING zinc finger, a motif known to be involved in protein-protein interactions. This protein associates transiently with microtubules, myosin, and titin during muscle sarcomere assembly. It may act as a transient adaptor and plays a regulatory role in the assembly of sarcomeres. Four alternatively spliced transcript variants encoding distinct isoforms have been described.

References

Further reading